Abronia mellifera is a species of sand verbena known by the common name white sand verbena.

This is a perennial plant endemic to the Northwestern United States, in Idaho, Wyoming, Oregon, Washington, and Utah.

References

External links
 USDA Plants Profile for Abronia mellifera (White sand verbena)

mellifera
Endemic flora of the United States
Flora of Idaho
Flora of Oregon
Flora of Utah
Endemic flora of Washington (state)
Flora of Wyoming
Plants described in 1829
Flora without expected TNC conservation status